Eva or Eua was a village of Cynuria, located inland not far from Neris. Pausanias, who visited the region in the 2nd century, on leaving Thyrea, came first to Anthene, next to Neris, and lastly to Eva, which he describes as the largest of the three villages, containing a sanctuary of Polemocrates, son of Machaon, who was honoured here as a god or hero of the healing art. Above these villages was the range of Mount Parnon, where, not far from the sources of the Tanus or Tanaus, the boundaries of the Lacedaemonians, Argives, and Tegeatae joined, and were marked by stone Hermae. This Eva is probably also meant by Stephanus of Byzantium, though he calls it a city of Arcadia.

Its site is tentatively located near the modern Helleniko.

References

Populated places in ancient Argolis
Populated places in ancient Laconia
Former populated places in Greece